Qomsheh Tappeh (also known as Qomsheh-ye Tappeh Qāsem) is a village in Mahidasht Rural District, Mahidasht District, Kermanshah County, Kermanshah Province, Iran. At the 2006 census, the population was 333 people, in 72 families.

References 

Populated places in Kermanshah County